Trog is a 1970 film.

Trog may also refer to:

 Shortened form of "troglodyte", see Cave dweller
 A type of frog-like enemy in the game Drakan: The Ancients' Gates
 A race of fictional cave-dwellers in the Edge Chronicles
 A deity in the video game Linley's Dungeon Crawl
 Trog (video game)
 Wally Fawkes (1924–2023), jazz clarinettist and cartoonist who wrote under the name, "Trog"

See also
 The Troggs, a British band originally called The Troglodytes
 Troglodyte (disambiguation)